Delhi Hills is a census-designated place (CDP) in Delhi Township, Hamilton County, Ohio, United States. The population was 5,022 at the 2020 census.

Geography

References

Census-designated places in Hamilton County, Ohio
Census-designated places in Ohio